Syrian Female Oriental Band is a Syrian eastern orchestra. Formed in 2003, the band consists of eight female graduates from the Higher
Institute of Music in Damascus.

Members
 Wafa'a Safar: ney (supervising)
 Dima Mawazini: qanun
 Rihab Azar: oud
 Razan Kassar: violin
 Hadeel Mirkhan: cello
 Raghad haddad:  viola
 Sana'a Wahba: double bass
 Khesab Khaled: riq

References

External links
http://www.alalyiaalaw.org/en/eventDetails.php?eventId=22

Syrian musical groups
All-female bands
Musical groups established in 2003